Chersotis is a genus of moths of the family Noctuidae.

Species
 Chersotis acutangula Staudinger, 1892
 Chersotis alpestris [Schiffermüller], 1775
 Chersotis anatolica Draudt, 1936
 Chersotis andereggii Boisduval, [1837]
 Chersotis capnistis Lederer, 1871
 Chersotis cuprea [Schiffermüller], 1775
 Chersotis cyrnea Spuler, 1908
 Chersotis deplana Freyer, 1831
 Chersotis deplanata Eversmann, 1843
 Chersotis eberti Dufay & Varga, 1995
 Chersotis ebertorum Koçak, 1980
 Chersotis elegans Eversmann, 1837
 Chersotis fimbriola Esper, [1803]
 Chersotis gratissima Corti, 1932
 Chersotis juncta Grote, 1878
 Chersotis kacem Le Cerf, 1933
 Chersotis laeta Rebel, 1904
 Chersotis larixia Guenée, 1852
 Chersotis margaritacea Villers, 1789
 Chersotis multangula Hübner, [1803]
 Chersotis ocellina [Schiffermüller], 1775
 Chersotis oreina Dufay, 1984
 Chersotis poliogramma (Hampson, 1903)
 Chersotis rectangula [Schiffermüller], 1775
 Chersotis sordescens Staudinger, 1900
 Chersotis transiens Staudinger, 1896
 Chersotis vicina Corti, 1930
 Chersotis zukowskyi Draudt, 1936

References
 Chersotis at Markku Savela's Lepidoptera and Some Other Life Forms
 Natural History Museum Lepidoptera genus database

Noctuinae
Moth genera